Jerome Matthew "Jerry" Dybzinski (born July 7, 1955) is an American former professional baseball shortstop. He played in Major League Baseball (MLB) for the Cleveland Indians, Chicago White Sox, and Pittsburgh Pirates.

Career
Dybzinski attended Collinwood High School. He attended Cleveland State University from 1974 to 1977, becoming the first of four Cleveland State alumni to play in the major leagues. He was drafted by the Cleveland Indians in the 15th round of the 1977 amateur draft on June 7, 1977. He spent a few years in the minor leagues, playing for the Batavia Muckdogs in 1977, the Waterloo Indians in 1978, and the Tacoma Tugs in 1979. Dybzinski had 25 stolen bases each in 1978 and 1979, leading all Waterloo players and finishing second to Dell Alston in Tacoma.

The Indians brought him up to the majors at the start of the 1980 season. He spent the season mostly at shortstop, serving as Tom Veryzer's backup, but also spent time at second and third base in the 114 games he played during the 1980 Cleveland Indians season. In 1981, Dybzinski played only 48 games for the Indians that season. He played one more season for the Indians, then on April 1, 1983, Dybzinski was traded to the Chicago White Sox for Pat Tabler.

The 1983 Chicago White Sox season wound up being the best season statistically for Dybzinski. He played 127 games as the starting shortstop, stealing 11 bases over the course of the season. In the 1983 American League Championship Series against the Baltimore Orioles, Dybzinski committed a critical baserunning error in game four (overrunning second base while third base was already occupied by Vance Law). He served as the backup to Scott Fletcher in 1984, and was released from the Chicago White Sox on April 1, 1985. He signed with the Pittsburgh Pirates on April 11, and was released at the end of the season. He signed as a free agent with the Seattle Mariners in January 1986, but was released before the season began, ending his major league career.

References

External links

Jerry Dybzinski at Baseball Almanac

1955 births
Living people
American expatriate baseball players in Canada
American people of Polish descent
Baseball players from Cleveland
Batavia Trojans players
Calgary Cannons players
Charleston Charlies players
Chicago White Sox players
Cleveland Indians players
Cleveland State Vikings baseball players
Hawaii Islanders players
Major League Baseball shortstops
Pittsburgh Pirates players
Tacoma Tugs players
Waterloo Indians players